The following is a list of points of interest in Albuquerque, New Mexico for which there are articles in English Wikipedia:

Points of interest

 Albuquerque Biological Park
 Albuquerque Aquarium
 Albuquerque Museum of Art and History (the Albuquerque Museum)
 American International Rattlesnake Museum
 Anderson-Abruzzo Albuquerque International Balloon Museum
 ¡Explora! Science Center and Children's Museum
 Indian Pueblo Cultural Center
 KiMo Theater
 Kirtland Air Force Base
 Maxwell Museum of Anthropology
 National Museum of Nuclear Science & History
 National Hispanic Cultural Center
 New Mexico Holocaust & Intolerance Museum 
 New Mexico Museum of Natural History and Science
 Old Town Albuquerque
 Petroglyph National Monument
 Rio Grande Botanic Garden
 Rio Grande Nature Center State Park
 Rio Grande Valley State Park
 Rio Grande Zoo
 Sandia National Laboratories
 Sandia Peak Aerial Tram
 Tingley Beach
 University of New Mexico
 University of New Mexico Arboretum
 University of New Mexico Art Museum (includes Jonson Gallery)
 Unser Racing Museum

See also
 List of historic landmarks in Albuquerque

points of interest